The Ltyentye Apurte Community, also known as Santa Teresa, is an Arrernte indigenous community in the Northern Territory, Australia, located about  south-east of Alice Springs.

History
The mission run by the Missionaries of the Sacred Heart at Arltunga was moved to Santa Teresa in 1953. It included a Mission school and dormitories which accommodated Aboriginal children aged 5 to 17 years. Hospital care was provided. Father Thomas Dixon was responsible for the church.

In 1976, administration was passed from the Mission to an Aboriginal land trust and the community was renamed Ltyentye Apurte. Although the residential section of the Mission school was closed in the same year, the day school remains operational and in the hands of the church.

The Keringke Arts Centre was established in 1989. Since 2007 women in the community have painted religious crosses which are exported to Catholic churches around the world.

In 1996, the population was recorded at 458, rising to 555 in 2011 and to 682 in 2016.

According to data from the 2011 census, Santa Teresa is the most Catholic place in Australia.

Governance
The community is governed by a Community Government Council which runs the health service (with dialysis room) and some other facilities. The community contains a Catholic primary/senior school, police station, airstrip and Catholic Church. Since 1 July 2008, the MacDonnell Shire is the responsible local government for the area.

Sport
Australian rules football is popular in the community, with matches played at the Santa Teresa Oval which was resurfaced from sand loam to grass in 2021 through a project in partnership with the AFL's Melbourne Football Club Red and Blue Foundation.

Awards 
In 2019, Ltyentye Apurte Community won the Australian Tidy Town Awards competition and is named Australian most sustainable Community.

References

External links
Macdonnell Shire - Ltyentye Apurte
Community profile - Santa Teresa (2009)

Aboriginal communities in the Northern Territory
Former local government areas of the Northern Territory
Australian Aboriginal missions
Arrernte
MacDonnell Region
Catholic Church in the Northern Territory